The 2011–12 Georgia Tech Yellow Jackets men's basketball team represented the Georgia Institute of Technology during the 2011–12 NCAA Division I men's basketball season. The Yellow Jackets, led by first-year head coach Brian Gregory, are members of the Atlantic Coast Conference. Due to renovations at their regular home arena, the Alexander Memorial Coliseum, the Yellow Jackets played their home games at Philips Arena and the Arena at Gwinnett Center. They finished the season 11–20, 4–12 in ACC play to finish in a tie for last place. They lost in the first round of the ACC Basketball tournament to Miami.

Roster

Schedule

|-
!colspan=9| Regular season

|-
!colspan=9| ACC men's basketball tournament

References

Georgia Tech Yellow Jackets men's basketball seasons
Georgia Tech
Georgia Tech
Georgia Tech